Fantasy Westward Journey is a MMORPG developed and run by NetEase. It was released for the Microsoft Windows platform in December 2001. The game is the most popular online game in China as of May 2007 by peak concurrent users (PCU), with a peak count of 1.5 million.  Registered users reached 25 million by April 2005, with 576,000 peak concurrent players on 198 game servers, considered the fastest growing online game in China at the time.  Average concurrent users was reported in August 2006 to be around 400,000.   The game uses the same engine as Westward Journey II with a distinctively different graphical style. Both games are inspired by the Chinese novel Journey to the West. Together with Westward Journey II, it is one of the highest-grossing video games of all time, having grossed an estimated $6.5 billion in lifetime revenue, as of 2019 and having 400 million users as of 2015.

History 
In 2006 July, the administrators dissolved a 700-member anti-Japanese guild, and locked the account of its founder for having an anti-Japanese username. A mass protest took place in the game days later on July 7, the anniversary of the beginning of the Second Sino-Japanese War, with up to 80,000 users joining the online protest on one of the servers.

Total registered users of Fantasy Westward Journey reached 310 million as of 2015.

Mobile version 
A mobile version was released for the Apple iOS and Google Android operating systems in 2015.

Fantasy Westward Journey launched its first 3D animation in 2015. After release on the Chinese mainstream online video platform, it successively launched on several Chinese TV stations.

Character introduction 
Swordsman

The swordsman is willful and unruly. Life is indifferent to fame and fortune, addicted to martial arts into obsession.

Exploiting Weapon: Sword

See also 
 Westward Journey Online II

References

External links
Official website

2001 video games
China-exclusive video games
Chinese-language-only video games
Video games developed in China
Massively multiplayer online role-playing games
NetEase games
Windows games
Windows-only games
Video games based on Chinese mythology